Benjamin Scott Hanlin (born 26 March 1986) is an English magician and presenter, known for presenting the ITV2 series Tricked from 2013 to 2016. In 2020, Hanlin competed in the twelfth series of Dancing on Ice, where he finished in fourth place.

Career
Hanlin presented a series called Breaking Magic for the Discovery Channel, as well as being a continuity presenter for CBBC. From 2013 to 2016, Hanlin presented three series of Tricked on ITV2. In January 2016, Hanlin joined Capital Birmingham hosting a Saturday afternoon show, which was later cancelled. However, he still covers Capital Breakfast on Capital Birmingham.

In January 2020, Hanlin began competing in the twelfth series of Dancing on Ice. On 1 March 2020, he finished in fourth place, alongside professional partner Carlotta Edwards.

References

External links

1986 births
English magicians
English radio presenters
English television presenters
People from Birmingham, West Midlands
Living people